This page details the all-time statistics, records, and other achievements pertaining to the Memphis Grizzlies.

Individual records

Franchise leaders 
Bold denotes still active with team.

Italic denotes still active but not with team.

Points scored (regular season) 

(as of the end of the 2021–22 season)
 Mike Conley (11,733)
 Marc Gasol (11,684)
 Zach Randolph (9,261)
 Pau Gasol (8,966)
 Rudy Gay (8,562)
 Shareef Abdur-Rahim (7,801)
 Mike Miller (5,982)
 Bryant Reeves (4,945)
 O. J. Mayo (4,584)
 Shane Battier (4,275)
 Tony Allen (4,128)
 Ja Morant (3,961)
 Dillon Brooks (3,955)
 Stromile Swift (3,829)
 Jason Williams (3,400)
 Jaren Jackson Jr. (3,218)
 Mike Bibby (3,153)
 Lorenzen Wright (3,148)
 Hakim Warrick (3,126)
 Michael Dickerson (2,710)

Other statistics (regular season) 
(as of the end of the 2021–22 season)

Individual awards

NBA Rookie of the Year
Pau Gasol - 2002
Ja Morant - 2020

NBA Coach of the Year
Hubie Brown – 2004

NBA Executive of the Year
Jerry West – 2004
Zach Kleiman – 2022

NBA Sixth Man of the Year
Mike Miller – 2006

NBA Defensive Player of the Year
Marc Gasol – 2013

NBA Most Improved Player
Ja Morant - 2022

NBA Sportsmanship Award
 Mike Conley  – 2014, 2016, 2019

Twyman–Stokes Teammate of the Year
Vince Carter – 2016
 Mike Conley  – 2019

All-NBA First Team
 Marc Gasol – 2015

All-NBA Second Team
 Marc Gasol – 2013
 Ja Morant – 2022

All-NBA Third Team
Zach Randolph – 2011

NBA All-Defensive First Team
 Tony Allen – 2012, 2013, 2015
 Jaren Jackson Jr. – 2022

NBA All-Defensive Second Team
 Tony Allen – 2011, 2016, 2017
Marc Gasol – 2013
Mike Conley – 2013

NBA All-Rookie First Team
Shareef Abdur-Rahim – 1997
Mike Bibby – 1999
Pau Gasol – 2002
Shane Battier – 2002
Drew Gooden – 2003
Rudy Gay – 2007
O. J. Mayo – 2009
Jaren Jackson Jr. – 2019
Brandon Clarke – 2020
Ja Morant – 2020

NBA All-Rookie Second Team
Bryant Reeves – 1996
Gordan Giriček – 2003
Juan Carlos Navarro – 2008
Marc Gasol – 2009
Desmond Bane – 2021

NBA All-Star Weekend
NBA All-Star selections
 Pau Gasol – 2006
 Zach Randolph – 2010, 2013
 Marc Gasol – 2012, 2015*, 2017
 Ja Morant – 2022*, 2023*
 Jaren Jackson, Jr. – 2023
*All-Star Game Starter

Three-Point Contest

Contestants

 Sam Mack – 1998 
 Mike Bibby – 2000
 Wesley Person – 2003
 Mike Miller – 2007
 Desmond Bane – 2022

Slam Dunk Contest

Contestants

 Stromile Swift – 2001

Skills Challenge

Contestants

 Mike Conley, Jr. – 2019

Rising Stars Challenge (formerly the Rookie Challenge)

 Bryant Reeves – 1996
 Roy Rogers – 1997
 Shareef Abdur-Rahim – 1997
 Antonio Daniels – 1998
 Michael Dickerson – 1999
 Mike Bibby – 1999
 Pau Gasol – 2002, 2003
 Shane Battier – 2002
 Drew Gooden – 2003
 Rudy Gay – 2007, 2008
 Mike Conley, Jr. – 2008
 Juan Carlos Navarro – 2008
 O.J. Mayo – 2009, 2010
 Marc Gasol – 2009, 2010
 Dillon Brooks – 2018
 Jaren Jackson, Jr. – 2019, 2020
 Ja Morant – 2020, 2021
 Brandon Clarke – 2020, 2021
 Desmond Bane – 2022
 Kenneth Lofton, Jr. – 2023 (G-League)

Western Conference Monthly & Weekly Awards 
Player of the Month
 Zach Randolph – Jan 2011
Coach of the Month

Hubie Brown - Feb 2004, Mar 2004
Mike Fratello - Jan 2005, Apr 2006
Lionel Hollins - Dec 2009, Nov 2012, Feb 2013
Taylor Jenkins - Jan 2020, Dec 2021

Rookie of the Month

Shareef Abdur-Rahim - Dec 1996, Feb 1997 (league-wide award)
Pau Gasol - Nov 2001, Jan 2002, Mar 2002
Shane Battier - Dec 2001
Drew Gooden - Nov 2002
Rudy Gay - Nov 2006
Tarence Kinsey - Apr 2006
O.J. Mayo - Nov 2008, Apr 2009
Nick Calathes - Feb 2014
Ja Morant - Oct/Nov 2019, Dec 2019, Jan 2020

Player of the Week
 Pau Gasol – 3 total – 2004–05 (1), 2006–07 (2)
 Zach Randolph – 4 total – 2010–11 (3), 2014–15 (1)
 Marc Gasol – 2 total – 2011–12 (1), 2016–17 (1)
Mike Conley – 1 total – 2018–19 (1)
Ja Morant – 2 total – 2021–22 (2)

References

records
National Basketball Association accomplishments and records by team